Elections to West Lindsey District Council were held on 4 May 2000. One third of the council was up for election and the council stayed under no overall control.

After the election, the composition of the council was
Liberal Democrat 16
Conservative 9
Independent 9
Labour 3

Election result

1 Independent candidate was unopposed.

Ward results

References
 "Election results: local councils", The Times 6 May 2000 page 10
 2000 West Lindsey election result
 Ward results

2000
2000 English local elections
2000s in Lincolnshire